The 1987–88 Syracuse Orangemen basketball team represented Syracuse University in the 1987–88 NCAA Division I men's basketball season.  The Head coach was Jim Boeheim, serving for his 12th year.  The team played home games at the Carrier Dome in Syracuse, New York.  The team finished with a 26–9 (11–5) record while making it to the second round of the NCAA tournament.

Roster

Schedule

|-
!colspan=12 style=| Non-Conference Regular Season

|-
!colspan=12 style=| Big East Conference Regular Season

|-
!colspan=12 style=| Non-Conference Regular Season

|-
!colspan=12 style=| Big East Conference Regular Season

|-
!colspan=12 style=| Non-Conference Regular Season

|-
!colspan=12 style=| Big East Conference Regular Season

|-
!colspan=12 style=| Big East Tournament

|-
!colspan=12 style=| NCAA Tournament

Rankings

Team Players in the 1988 NBA draft

References 

Syracuse Orange men's basketball seasons
Syracuse Orange
Syracuse
Syracuse Orange
Syracuse Orange